Jatyr Eduardo Schall, commonly known as Jatyr Schall, or simply as Jatyr (born October 18, 1938 in São Paulo) is a former Brazilian professional basketball player.

National team career
With the senior Brazilian national basketball team, Jatyr won bronze medals at the 1960 Summer Olympic Games, and the 1964 Summer Olympic Games. He also won gold medals at the 1959 FIBA World Championship and 1963 FIBA World Championship, and a bronze medal at the 1967 FIBA World Championship.

References

1938 births
Living people
Basketball players at the 1960 Summer Olympics
Basketball players at the 1964 Summer Olympics
Brazilian men's basketball players
1959 FIBA World Championship players
1963 FIBA World Championship players
1967 FIBA World Championship players
Brazilian people of German descent
FIBA World Championship-winning players
Olympic basketball players of Brazil
Olympic medalists in basketball
Basketball players at the 1959 Pan American Games
Pan American Games bronze medalists for Brazil
Pan American Games medalists in basketball
Small forwards
Sociedade Esportiva Palmeiras basketball players
Basketball players from São Paulo
Olympic bronze medalists for Brazil
Medalists at the 1964 Summer Olympics
Medalists at the 1959 Pan American Games